Pal Lahara is a small town in Angul district of the state of Odisha and located on NH6, where it intersects with NH23,  by road north of Angul. Not far from the banks of the Rengali Reservoir which is to the west, the Malayagiri Forest Range is to the southeast. Pallahara is one of the subdivisional headquarters in the Angul district.

History
Pallahara was the capital of Pal Lahara State, which was a small princely state of British India.

The forests in the area were traditionally rich in bamboo and the local Juang people are adept at basketry.

Connectivity
Pallahara is the center of Odisha. It has good connectivity to Bhubaneswar Keonjhar, Rourkela, and Sambalpur by night buses. There is no train line to Pallahara. The nearest railway station to Pallahara is Talcher road. The Bhubaneswar airport and Jharsuguda airport are nearly equal distances from Pallahara. The Pallahara is underdeveloped although it is the center of Odisha.

References

External links

Cities and towns in Angul district